Judge Dooley may refer to:

James Dooley (Rhode Island politician) (1886–1960), judge of the Rhode Island Eighth District Court
Joseph Brannon Dooley (1889–1967), judge of the United States District Court for the Northern District of Texas
Kari A. Dooley (born 1963), judge of the United States District Court for the District of Connecticut

See also
Justice Dooley (disambiguation)